The "", also known by its incipit, "", is the national anthem of Costa Rica. The music was created to receive delegates from the United Kingdom and the United States that year for the Webster-Crampton Treaty. It was the first Central American national anthem.

The anthem has had several lyrics; the current lyrics were written for a contest held in 1903 by the government of Ascensión Esquivel Ibarra to give the anthem lyrics that reflected the idea of being Costa Rican. The contest was won by José María Zeledón Brenes.

The anthem's lyrics were made official in 1949 by the Founding Junta of the Second Republic, led by José Figueres Ferrer. The music was made official in 1979, under President Rodrigo Carazo Odio.

History 
From the period of independence within the First Mexican Empire from 1821 to the beginning of the First Costa Rican Republic in 1848, Costa Rica did not have a national anthem. After the establishment of the republic, Costa Rica began to gain more recognition from other nations. In 1852, then president, Juan Rafael Mora Porras, learnt of the arrival of diplomatic representatives from the United Kingdom and United States in order to establish embassies.

Musician and Director of the Costa Rican Military Band, then 22 years old, was asked to compose an anthem. Professing a lack of experience and little time, Gutiérrez asked for help from French adventurer , who instructed and encouraged him. After consulting Lafond, Gutiérrez composed the anthem in three or four days in his home in central San José. An apocryphal story circulates that Gutiérrez had to compose the music for the anthem while locked in a prison cell for refusing the order the president gave him to compose the anthem, and that he composed the anthem in 24 hours.

The event was held in the Main Barracks, where the Raventós Theatre was later situated, today the Melico Salazar Theatre.

The anthem was largely forgotten after this, so much so that lyrics for it were not made official until 1949, after the civil war and the founding of the Second Republic, and the music was not made official until 1 September 1979, with decree 10471-E, during the presidency of Rodrigo Carazo Odio. The decree was intended to coincide with Gutiérrez's birthday (which is now known to be 3 September).

Lyrics 
There was no intention to add lyrics at the time of the anthem's creation, as it was urgently needed for the welcome ceremonies for the foreign delegations. Some lyrics had been written in 1856 during the Filibuster War, to encourage troops on the battlefield, but they were quickly forgotten.

1873 lyrics 
The first lyrics of the national anthem were written by a Colombian poet living in Costa Rica, José Manuel Lleras, and premiered in 1873. In the context of looming threats by other states to overthrow then president Tomás Guardia Gutiérrez, as well as a threat of the instrumental anthem becoming forgotten by non–military band members, Lleras wrote long lyrics that included high praise of President Guardia, intended encourage Costa Ricans in the event of war:

Lleras's lyrics were forgotten after the events regarding President Guardia.

1879 lyrics 
Garita's lyrics were very simplistic:

Like Lleras's lyrics, Garita's lyrics also stopped being sung. The Lleras and Garita lyrics were never officially adopted.

1888 lyrics 
In 1888, Spanish pedagogue Juan Fernández Ferraz wrote a poetic third set of lyrics for the national anthem, which were longer than the previous lyrics. After being distributed in schools and colleges, they were sung for longer and were made official:

Current lyrics 
Although Fernández Ferraz's composition had literary merit, its language was somewhat too elevated to take root in the people, in addition to not adapting well to the music of the anthem, and adjustments had to be made to the original score by maestro Gutiérrez. All of this led to a decision to replace Fernández Ferraz's lyrics with new lyrics, for which a public contest was held in 1903. The contest was won by a composition by José María Zeledón Brenes, presented under the pseudonym . Zeledón Brenes was declared the winner on 24 August, and his lyrics were first sung publicly on 15 September.

Zeledón Brenes's lyrics, with minor changes, are the current lyrics of the national anthem of Costa Rica. They were officially adopted on 10 June 1949 by the Founding Junta of the Second Republic with decree number 551:

In Zeledón's original wording, the first stanza read:

And the last:

Notes

References

External links
 Boletín de Cientec sobre los símbolos patrios
 Himno a la Bandera de Costa Rica - MP3 File
 Más que un canto, Documentary the history of the Lyric and music of the himno.
 La Paz - Debajo del Canto, analysis of texts and events that inspired the national anthem.

Spanish-language songs
Costa Rica
Costa Rican songs
National symbols of Costa Rica
National anthems
National anthem compositions in E-flat major